Tetronarce tremens, commonly known as the Chilean torpedo, is a species of fish in the family Torpedinidae. It is found in Chile, Colombia, Costa Rica, Ecuador, and Peru. Its natural habitat is open seas.

References

Tetronarce
Fish described in 1959
Strongly electric fish
Taxonomy articles created by Polbot